Firoza Begum is the name of:

 Firoza Begum (actress), Jewish Indian actress
 Firoza Begum (singer) (1930–2014), Bangladeshi singer